The 5th constituency of Meurthe-et-Moselle is a French legislative constituency in the Meurthe-et-Moselle département.

Description

Meurthe-et-Moselle's 5th Constituency consists of the south west portion of the department based around the small town of Toul, which lies on the river Moselle.

Historically the seat has swung between right and left leaning parties. Since 1988 it has had no fewer than six different representatives, changing hands at every election with the exception of 2007 and 2017. After the 2017 election it became the only seat held by the Socialist Party in the department.

In the 2022 election, incumbent PS deputy Dominique Potier distanced himself from the NUPES alliance, choosing to run as an independent left candidate. However, Potier rejoined the PS upon the start of the new term of the National Assembly.

Historic Representation

Election results

2022 

 
 
|-
| colspan="8" bgcolor="#E9E9E9"|
|-
 

 
 
 
 

* In the absence of a PS candidate, Potier's result is counted against his previous result in swing calculations, despite his designation as DVG.

2017

2012

 
 
 
 
 
 
|-
| colspan="8" bgcolor="#E9E9E9"|
|-

Sources
Official results of French elections from 2002: "Résultats électoraux officiels en France" (in French).

5